Han Chang-wha (Hangul: 한창화, Hanja: 韓昌華, 3 November 1922 – 18 April 2006) was a South Korean football defender who played for South Korea in the 1954 FIFA World Cup. He also played for Seoul Football Club.

References

External links
FIFA profile

1922 births
South Korean footballers
South Korea international footballers
Association football defenders
1954 FIFA World Cup players
2006 deaths
Asian Games medalists in football
Footballers at the 1954 Asian Games
Medalists at the 1954 Asian Games
Asian Games silver medalists for South Korea